Fort Pontchartrain du Détroit or Fort Detroit (1701–1796) was a fort established on the north bank of the Detroit River by the French officer Antoine de la Mothe Cadillac and the Italian Alphonse de Tonty in 1701. In the 18th century, French colonial settlements developed on both sides of the river, based on the fur trade, missions, and farms.

The site of the former fort, north of the Rouge River, is now within the city of Detroit in the U.S. state of Michigan, an area bounded by Larned Street, Griswold Street, Washington Blvd. and the Civic Center (now occupied by office towers).

The fort was taken over by the British after the French surrendered Montreal in 1760 during the French and Indian War (part of the Seven Years' War). The British held it until the American Revolutionary War, and it was taken over by the United States afterward. The British built Fort Lernoult to the north along the river in 1779. This was later renamed Fort Shelby and was abandoned by the US military in the 1820s. The city of Detroit demolished Fort Shelby in 1827.

History and toponymy
The river located between Lakes Saint Clair and Erie became known as le Détroit, "the Strait". In 1701, Cadillac ordered a fort built on the west side of the river, to prevent British colonists from moving into the west, and to monopolize the fur trade in central North America. Cadillac had been commandant of Fort de Buade, another French outpost in North America. Fort de Buade was abandoned in 1697 due to conflicts with religious leaders over the trading of alcohol to the Native Americans. Cadillac persuaded his superiors to let him build a new settlement. He reached the Detroit River on July 23, 

When he landed at the site, Cadillac celebrated formally taking control of the area. In honor of Louis Phélypeaux, Comte de Pontchartrain (or his son, Jérôme both from the city of Jouars-Pontchartrain), Minister of Marine to Louis XIV, Cadillac named the new settlement as Fort Pontchartrain du Détroit. Construction of the storehouse and the stockade were started immediately, but the first building completed was Ste. Anne's Catholic Church. The stockade was the second structure completed and was made of logs with defensive bastions or towers in each corner.

After the fort was established, some Ottawa and Huron settled near it for the convenience of trading with the French. A French Jesuit mission to the Huron was established across the river, developed as L'Assomption Church, and the center of what became the Petite Côte settlement of French colonists by the mid-18th century. Later encompassed by Sandwich (now Windsor), Petite Côte was the oldest continually occupied European settlement in what later became Ontario.

Military conflicts

The first major conflict of Fort Detroit occurred in March 1706 while Cadillac was away. The Ottawa heard a rumor about a Huron tribe ambush. The Ottawa attacked and killed several members of the Miami tribe. The Miami sought safety in the fort, where they were defended by the soldiers. The French killed about 30 Ottawa warriors when they attacked the fort. After the battle, Miami attacked an Ottawa village.  In the conflict, a French priest and sergeant were both caught outside the walls and killed.

The fort was commanded by Étienne de Veniard, Sieur de Bourgmont. Bourgmont was criticized for his handling of the incident. When Cadillac returned, Bourgmont and some soldiers from the fort deserted. The French captured one of the deserters, who testified that the deserting party had shot and killed one of its own and cannibalized him.

Bourgmont remained on the lam, living with Native Americans. He took a Native American wife and had a child with her. According to the matrilineal kinship system of the Odawa and related tribes, children were considered born to the mother's people and belonged to her clan, so mixed-race children such as Bourgmont's were brought up in the tribal culture. Descent and inheritance were counted through the maternal line.

In 1718, Bourgmont was decorated by the French government with the Cross of St. Louis and given an order of nobility. He was recognized as the first European to map the Missouri and Platte rivers and for enlisting the Native Americans to side with the French against the Spanish.

Cadillac was removed under accusations of corruption. In 1710, François de la Forêt was appointed as Cadillac's successor, but sent Jacques-Charles Renaud Dubuisson to administer his role. In 1712, Jacques-Charles Renaud Dubuisson officially replaced Cadillac as commander at Fort Detroit.

When the Fox heard of this change, they planned an attack on the fort (after some of Cadillac's Native American supporters had left). They besieged the fort in late April 1710, with a mixed force of about 1,000 Fox, Sac, and Mascoutens. The Ottawa and the Huron warriors were out on a raid and so could not help the French. Jean Baptiste Bissot, Sieur de Vincennes, commander of the French outpost at Kekionga (now Fort Wayne, Indiana) and seven fur traders reached the fort, sneaking through Fox lines. Dubuisson sent messengers to the Ottawa and Huron Indians, who returned to the fort's aid.

The Fox and their allies became caught between the French and their traditional enemies; they were besieged until the end of May. They fled to what is now Windmill Point, where the French and Huron warriors pursued them. After four days of the siege there, the Fox surrendered to spare their families. The French agreed but, after the Fox were disarmed, the French attacked and killed all of them. This event is known in the Grosse Pointe area as the Fox Indian Massacre. This siege of Fort Detroit was the opening incident in the Fox Wars.

British takeover of the fort
After a few years, the British and French conflict in North America, a front in the Seven Years' War of Europe, came to a head in the French and Indian War which broke out in 1754. Detroit was far removed from the main areas of conflict and was not involved in combat. Two months after the capitulation in 1760 of the French at Montreal, on November 29, 1760, the French ceded Fort Detroit to the British Army's Rogers' Rangers.

British rule differed in several major ways from French rule. The British required greater taxes and confiscated weapons from settlers they classified as "unfriendly", a category they used for many French Canadians. The British refused to sell ammunition to the French Canadians or to the Native Americans who had been trading with the French. The French traders had armed many of their trading partners with guns for years, beginning with the five Iroquois nations in New York. The British changes limited the ability of the Native Americans to trap and hunt, as well as rendering them less of a threat. The British colonists did not emphasize maintaining good relationships with the Native Americans. But the French Canadians had formed many families through intermarriage and knew about the Native American custom of giving gifts.

After the French left the conflict, Pontiac, war-leader of the Ottawa, rallied several tribes in Pontiac's Rebellion. He attempted to capture Detroit from the British on May 7, 1763. They failed to capture the fort as the British were forewarned of the attack, but did lay siege to it (see the Siege of Fort Detroit).

The British force in the fort, commanded by Henry Gladwin, consisted of 130 soldiers with two 6-pound cannons, one 3-pound cannon, and three mortars. The 6-gun schooner Huron was anchored nearby in the Detroit River. Two months into the siege, on July 29, 1763, the British brought a large relief force into the area. Skirmishing in the area, including the Battle of Bloody Run, continued until mid-November when the Indians dispersed.

During the American Revolutionary War, Detroit was far to the west of the main areas of action. The British used the fort to arm American Indian raiding parties, who attacked rebel colonial settlements to the southeast. American revolutionaries, particularly George Rogers Clark, hoped to mount an expedition to Detroit to neutralize these operations, but could not raise enough men to attempt. However, Clark did capture Henry Hamilton, the Lieutenant-Governor and Superintendent of Indian Affairs of the Province of Quebec and senior officer at Fort Detroit, when he traveled south to Fort Sackville.

United States fortification
In late 1778, while Hamilton was still being held as a prisoner of war, Captain Richard B. Lernoult began construction on a new fortification situated a few hundred yards to the north of the original fort. It was named Fort Lernoult on October 3, 1779. This new fort largely superseded the original fort and was often referred to as "Fort Detroit."

Following the United States gaining independence in the Revolution, the government made the Treaty of Greenville in 1795 with several Indian tribes. They ceded several blocks of land to the United States that were beyond the Greenville Treaty Line and within the Indians' territory.

Article 3, Item 12 notes:  
The post of Detroit, and all the land to the north, the west and the south of it, of which the Indian title has been extinguished by gifts or grants to the French or English governments: and so much more land to be annexed to the district of Detroit, as shall be comprehended between the river Rosine [known today as the River Rouge], on the south, lake St. Clair on the north, and a line, the general course whereof shall be six miles distant from the west end of Lake Erie and Detroit river.

On July 11, 1796, under terms negotiated in the Jay Treaty, the British surrendered Fort Detroit, Fort Lernoult, and the surrounding settlement to the Americans, 13 years after the Treaty of Paris ended the war and ceded the area to the United States.

Some accounts say that only Fort Lernoult survived the 1805 fire that destroyed most of Detroit. It appears that no part of the original Fort Detroit remained after this time. Fort Lernoult was officially renamed Fort Detroit in 1805, then renamed Fort Shelby in 1813. Soon after its use by the military ended, the fort was demolished by the City of Detroit in 1827.

Location
The second Hotel Pontchartrain, now named the Fort Pontchartrain a Wyndham Hotel, is located on the former site of the fort.  The Michigan Historical Marker for Fort Pontchartrain is located at the southwest corner of the Crowne Plaza, at Jefferson Ave. and Washington Blvd.

References

Notes

Works cited

Further reading

Detroit
Detroit
Detroit
Detroit River
History of Detroit
Detroit
French-American culture in Michigan
Michigan in the American Revolution
Military history of Michigan
1701 establishments in New France
 Military installations established in 1701
 Military installations closed in 1797
1797 disestablishments in the Northwest Territory